RV Onnuri is one of the Korean Ocean Research and Development Institute (KORDI)'s research vessels. She was built in Bergen, Norway in 1991 by Mjellem & Karlsen Verft AS and designed by Skipsteknisk AS. She has been used to supply Korea's Antarctic research station (King Sejong Station) as well as undertaking oceanographic research in the Pacific Ocean. She has a sister ship, Eardo, also operated by KORDI.

References 

Research vessels
1991 ships